ZNH-FM is a radio station in Nassau, Bahamas broadcasting a Top 40/Mainstream urban radio format.

External links 
 

Radio stations in the Bahamas
Adult contemporary radio stations
Mainstream urban radio stations
Urban contemporary radio stations
Urban adult contemporary radio stations